Tim Storms (born August 28, 1972) is an American singer and composer. He holds the Guinness World Record for both the "lowest note produced by a human" and the "widest vocal range".

Musical career 
Born in Tulsa, Oklahoma, Storms was raised in Waterloo, Indiana. His musical affinity appeared at a young age. Four days after graduating from high school, he returned to Oklahoma to begin his career in Christian music. Since then, Storms has appeared with a number of singing groups, including Freedom, Vocal Union, AVB, Acappella, and Rescue. He also performed with the cast of Branson’s "50s at the Hop," was voted Branson’s Bass Singer of the Year for three years in a row, and is in the Branson’s Entertainers Hall of Fame. Storms joined Pierce Arrow Theater in Branson at the beginning of the 2006 season.

As well as his performances across the US, Storms has also performed in Brazil, France, Switzerland, Jamaica, and Fiji. In 2012, after auditioning to record with the St. Petersburg Chamber Choir in Saint Petersburg, Storms was selected by composer Paul Mealor, producer Anna Barry and Decca Records to record four songs with the choir. Two of the four songs, "De Profundis" and "The Twelve Brigands," ended up on the Universal/Decca Records release, Tranquility Voices of Deep Calm.

Guinness World Record 
Storms' Guinness World Record for the lowest note produced by a human was first certified in January 2002. Storms also holds the Guinness World Record for the widest vocal range for any human. His records have been published in the Guinness World Records 2006. He broke both of these records in August 2008. As of 2008, the new record for lowest note was 0.7973 Hz, and the new record for Widest Vocal Range For Any Human was ten octaves.

In 2012, Storms reclaimed the record for the Lowest Note Produced by a Human. The new record is G−7, or 0.189 Hz, eight octaves below the lowest G on the piano, or just over seven octaves below the piano. The most recent published record is in the 2020 Guinness Book of World Records.

Storms' record-setting sounds are so low as to be infrasonic, incapable of being perceived by the human ear. The 2012 record requires more than five seconds for the vocal cords to oscillate once.

(above)G−7

Singing voice 
Storms is a deep bass (basso profondo). He possesses a vocal range of 10 octaves (G/G#−5 to G/G#5). He has extended his lower range to G−7 (0.189 Hz) while breaking his own record for the widest vocal range for a male singer. His lowest frequencies can only be heard by elephants and various animals that use low frequencies for communication, as well as dedicated scientific measurement devices.

See also 
J.D. Sumner
 Georgia Brown (Brazilian singer)

References

External links 
 Official Site of Tim Storms Voiceover

1972 births
Musicians from Tulsa, Oklahoma
Living people
American basses
Singers from Indiana
20th-century American singers
21st-century American singers
20th-century American male singers
21st-century American male singers